The effects of Hurricane Georges in Haiti included about $200 million (1998 USD, $315 million 2019 USD) in damages and 209 fatalities. Georges impacted the country at Category 1 strength.

Background

Hurricane Georges began as a tropical wave that moved off the coast of Africa during mid-September 1998. Tracking westward, the wave spawned an area of low pressure two days later, which quickly strengthened into a tropical depression. On September 16, the depression was upgraded to Tropical Storm Georges, and to Hurricane Georges the next day.

Over the following five days, the hurricane tracked through the Greater Antilles, causing over 600 fatalities, mainly in Haiti and the Dominican Republic. By September 25, Georges entered the Gulf of Mexico as a Category 2 hurricane. Upon landfall, the hurricane's forward motion slowed to an eastward drift. Georges continued to diminish until it completely died down on October 1 near the Atlantic coast of Florida.

Preparations 
A hurricane warning was first issued on September 21, and ended on September 23. Haiti declared a state of alert on September 22, with businesses and schools being closed down and schools being used for possible shelters.

Impact
Georges was already a weakened hurricane upon reaching Haiti, but cities and other areas of low elevation were still in danger of high winds, mudslides, and flooding. Haiti's capital received minimal damage, although there was flooding in low-lying areas and the main commercial port was damaged. The rest of the country, however, experienced a significant number of flash floods due to deforestation along the mountains. Mudslides destroyed or severely damaged many houses, leaving 167,332 homeless. Floods left the greatest impact along the northern coastline from Cap-Haïtien to Gonaïves. On the southern coast, the head of a U.S.-based medical team, stranded for several days by flooding in the remote town of Belle-Anse, anticipated a rise in malnutrition, disease, homelessness and poverty. Hurricane Georges caused citizens to have no access to clean water, which added to the already unsanitary conditions from dirty flood water and rampant diseases. In all, there were 209 fatalities, although there could be more. The cause of deaths was mainly due to the poor infrastructure in the country and the spread of diseases along with malnutrition.

Like in the Dominican Republic, the agricultural sector suffered extreme damage. After a severe drought in 1997, severe flooding from the hurricane stopped any chances of recovering quickly. Most of the country's significant crop land, including Artibonite Valley, suffered total losses. Up to 80% of banana plantations were lost, while vegetable, roots, tubers, and other food crops were destroyed. In addition, thousands of livestock were missing. Total agricultural losses amounted to $179 million (1998 USD, $281 million 2019 USD).

Aftermath
The country requested food assistance in the aftermath of the hurricane to alleviate the serious losses. Organizations such as the BHR/OFDA offered monetary assistance and provided limited amounts of resources such as blankets, water, and plastic sheeting. CWS sent some of its members to Haiti to scope the extent of aid needed and provided kits containing cleaning supplies and toiletries. CWS and FEMA partnered together to gather volunteers and oversee rebuilding efforts. Cuba provided medical assistance and gave additional training to Haitian doctors through an agreement made with Haiti.

See also

Hurricane Georges
Effects of Hurricane Georges in the Dominican Republic
1998 Atlantic hurricane season

References

External links
 NHC Georges Report

Hurricane Georges
1998 in Haiti
Georges